Saturnella may refer to:
 Saturnella (alga), a genus of algae in the family Oocystaceae
 Saturnella (protist), a genus of protists in the family Ammodiscidae